The Adriatic Mills was a historic industrial complex on Armory Street in Worcester, Massachusetts.  In 1854 Eli Thayer (best known for his abolitionist activities) constructed a stone industrial building known as the Lower Junction Shop,  He constructed the mill with stone chips taken from Oread Hill in Worcester. The fine stone was mixed with a mortar forming a concrete. Wooden frames were mounted and the concrete was poured in and allowed to harden - no masonry being employed in raising the walls. The original building was 400 ft long. 40 ft wide and 2 stories high. Mr. Thayer then sold his interest in the building to Charles White and J.P. Southgate. Afterwards, it came into possession of Benjamin F. Joslyn, an arms manufacturer.  He manufactured the Joslyn rifle, the first breech-loading rifle, on these premises before selling them in 1863 to the Jordan Marsh Company.  Jordan Marsh expanded and repurposed the premises for the production of textiles, and gave the complex the name "Adriatic Mills".  It continued to be used for textile production into the 1920s.

The complex was listed on the National Register of Historic Places in 1980, at which time it was being used as a foundry by the Chromalloy Corporation.  It has since been demolished (c. 2009) to make way for redevelopment.

See also
National Register of Historic Places listings in southwestern Worcester, Massachusetts
National Register of Historic Places listings in Worcester County, Massachusetts

References

Industrial buildings and structures on the National Register of Historic Places in Massachusetts
Industrial buildings completed in 1854
National Register of Historic Places in Worcester County, Massachusetts
Demolished buildings and structures in Massachusetts
1854 establishments in Massachusetts